Johnny García Lopez (born 19 July 1978 in Guadalajara, Jalisco) is a Mexican former professional footballer who played as a defender.

Club career
García made his debut for Club Deportivo Guadalajara of the Primera División de México as a midfielder in the 2001 Spring season, eventually playing nine games that season.  After three more seasons as a midfielder, García was moved to central defense by Hans Westerhof, where he was a consistent starter throughout 2004. He joined Chivas USA in August 2006. His stint with Chivas USA lasted a short while, as he was released and consequently bought by Jaguares de Chiapas, marking his return to the Mexican Primera Division. With Chivas, García made a last minute goal against his current team Chiapas F.C.. This secured Chivas a semi-final berth, where it played against Pachuca and managed another last minute goal. During the 2007 Draft Santos Laguna acquired him from Chiapas F.C.

References
 Johnny Garcia at MedioTiempo.com

1978 births
Living people
Footballers from Guadalajara, Jalisco
Association football defenders
Mexican footballers
C.D. Guadalajara footballers
Chivas USA players
Santos Laguna footballers
Chiapas F.C. footballers
Liga MX players
Major League Soccer players
Mexican expatriate footballers
Expatriate soccer players in the United States
Mexican expatriate sportspeople in the United States